The AN/SPS-67 is a short-range, two-dimensional, surface-search/navigation radar system that provides highly accurate surface and limited low-flyer detection and tracking capabilities.

History
The AN/SPS-67 is a solid-state replacement for the AN/SPS-10 radar, using a more reliable antenna and incorporating standard electronic module technology for simpler repair and maintenance. The AN/SPS-67 provides excellent performance in rain and sea clutter, and is useful in harbor navigation, since the AN/SPS-67 is capable of detecting buoys and small obstructions without difficulty.

The AN/SPS-67(V)1 radar is a two-dimensional (azimuth and range) pulsed radar set primarily designed for surface operations with a secondary capability of anti-ship-missile and low flier detection. The radar set operates in the 5450 to 5825 MHz range, using a coaxial magnetron as the transmitter output tube. The transmitter/receiver is capable of operation in several pulse width settings: a long (1.0 µs), medium (0.25 µs), or short (0.10 µs) pulse mode to enhance radar performance for specific operational or tactical situations. Pulse repetition frequencies (PRF) of 750,1200, and 2400 pulses/second are used for the long, medium, and short pulse modes, respectively. The higher PRF settings coupled with the shortest pulse increases the resolution of the return and enables the radar operator/observer to discern or differentiate between a single large target or 2 smaller targets in close proximity to each other.

Variants

AN/SPS-67(V)1 – Replacement for AN/SPS-10 utilizing -10 antenna.
AN/SPS-67(V)2 – Improved linear-array antenna and increased bearing accuracy over original.
AN/SPS-67(V)3 – Used on Flight I s and includes digital automatic target detection (ATD), track while scan (TWS) and moving target indicator (DMTI).
AN/SPS-67(V)4 – Uses a slotted waveguide-type antenna
AN/SPS-67(V)5 – Used on Arleigh Burke-class destroyers Flights II and onwards. Compared to previous variants, it provides more modernized detection and tracking capabilities, can support gun engagements, and has improved performance in littoral environments.

See also
Electronics Technician

References

External links
GlobalSecurity.org - AN/SPS-67
Electronics Technician Vol 4 - AN/SPS-67
NAVAIR warfighters encyclopedia - AN/SPS-67

Sea radars
Military electronics of the United States